For the 1985 Vuelta a España, the field consisted of 170 riders; 101 finished the race.

By rider

By nationality

References

Further reading

1985 Vuelta a España
1985